Echtermeyer is a surname. Notable people with the surname include:

Curt Echtermeyer (1896–1971), Chilean-German painter
Ernst Theodor Echtermeyer (1805–1844), German writer and philosopher